Rumbula  is an air base located  southeast of Riga city centre in Latvia. The airfield was used for military purposes in the 1950s and 1960s. In the 1960s it was used as temporary passenger airport for bigger planes until the new Riga International Airport was opened in 1973. At least since 2001 there has been no military or commercial aviation based in Rumbula. Now it is mainly used as the biggest auto market in Latvia, and only about five small general aviation planes are based here. The runway is in very poor condition. It has many potholes and concrete blocks are often used to learn how to drive a car, or for "test drives" of cars to be sold at the market. There are also a few "bomb-proof" camouflaged military hangars (one example is located at 56°53'08.39" N / 24°13'33.93" E). The hangars are mainly used as storage or general purpose facilities; they are not obvious on satellite images and are not freely accessible on the ground.
 
However, lately, mainly on weekends, motorized paragliders and ultra-light planes are using the runway. Airsport enthusiasts are taking control of the runway and stop students from driving cars so that they will not interfere with gliders and planes.

History 

The airfield was used by the USSR Air Force before and during World War II. On June 22, 1941, the 46th dive bomber aviation regiment was based at the airfield.

During the period from 1945 to 1953, the 265th Fighter Aviation Regiment 336th Fighter Aviation Division was based on the Yak-9U and MiG-15 aircraft (from 1950 of the year). The regiment in 1953 relocated to the airfield Poduzheme Kemsky district Karelian Autonomous Soviet Socialist Republic.

In the period from December 14, 1944, to February 1946, the 33rd Fighter Aviation Regiment 106th Fighter Aviation Division of the Air Defense was based at the aerodrome. The regiment covered the city of Riga from enemy air raids. In February 1946, the regiment relocated to the airfield in the city Kaunas Lithuanian SSR.

From March 2, 1946, the from the Romania 164th Fighter Aviation Galatsky Red Banner Order of Suvorov Regiment was included in the 336th Fighter Aviation Division on airplanes Yak-9U, which was based at the aerodrome until April 1, 1947, after which it was here and disbanded.

From September 1953 to 1980, the 899th Orshansky Red Banner Order of Suvorov. E. Dzerzhinsky Fighter Aviation Regiment was based at the airfield. In November 1975, the regiment took part in the suppression of the mutiny aboard the Soviet frigate Storozhevoy. In spring 1980, the regiment, part of the 1st Guards Stalingradsko-Berlinskaya Red Banner Fighter Aviation Division, 15th Air Army, moved from Riga-Rumbula to Lielvārde airfield.

Airplanes Mikoyan-Gurevich MiG-15, MiG-17, MiG-19,  MiG-21 PFM, MiG-21bis.

In the 60s of the last century, it was used as a temporary passenger airport for large aircraft until the construction of the new international Riga airport, which was opened in 1973, was completed.

Currently, the airfield is used as a car market, which is the largest in Latvia, as well as for the home base of small aircraft.

References

Bibliography

Latvian airbases
Soviet Air Force bases